The Bingen Technical University of Applied Sciences (German: Technische Hochschule Bingen) is a university located in Bingen am Rhein, Germany. It was founded in 1897. The University of Applied Sciences Bingen consists of two faculties: the faculty of life sciences and engineering and the faculty of technology, informatics and business.

History and profile
The University of Applied Sciences Bingen was started out of the in 1897 established Rheinisches Technikum in Bingen in Bingen am Rhein.

See also
 Fachhochschule
 List of colleges and universities
 Bingen am Rhein

External links
University of Applied Sciences Bingen 

 
1897 establishments in Germany
Universities and colleges in Rhineland-Palatinate
Universities of Applied Sciences in Germany
Educational institutions established in 1897